John Howat (born 15 July 1970) is a former Australian rules footballer who played with Melbourne and Richmond in the Australian Football League (AFL).

A tall utility player, Howat was used on both ends of the ground during his league career, which began in 1989. In his four seasons with Melbourne he never played more than six games in a season.

He was picked up by Richmond with the 97th selection of the 1992 AFL Draft, where he rejoined with his previous coach John Northey. In just his second game for his new club, against the Brisbane Bears, Howat had 25 disposals and earned three Brownlow Medal votes for his efforts. Unlike at Melbourne, Howat was able to establish a regular place in the team and missed just three games in his debut season. He added another 17 games in 1994 and although he played just four times the following year, he appeared in Richmond's preliminary final loss.

Howat was delisted after the 1996 season and went on to coach Mitcham in the Eastern Football League, in 1999 and 2000.
He played on some of the games great full forwards of all time including Tony Lockett, Jason Dunstall, Warwick Capper and  Gary Ablett Senior.

References

1970 births
Australian rules footballers from Victoria (Australia)
Melbourne Football Club players
Richmond Football Club players
Living people